Saint-Martin-en-Campagne is a former commune in the Seine-Maritime department in the Normandy region in northern France. On 1 January 2016, it was merged into the new commune of Petit-Caux.

Geography
Huge chalk cliffs rise up over a pebble beach and overlook the English Channel. The Penly Nuclear Power Plant is also sited in this commune.

Heraldry

Population

Places of interest
 The church of Notre-Dame, dating from the fifteenth century.
 A stone cross from the sixteenth century.
 The Penly Nuclear Power Plant on the coast, with two reactors of 1300 MW each.

See also
Communes of the Seine-Maritime department

References

Former communes of Seine-Maritime